Calcium-48 is a scarce isotope of calcium containing 20 protons and 28 neutrons. It makes up 0.187% of natural calcium by mole fraction. Although it is unusually neutron-rich for such a light nucleus, its beta decay is extremely hindered, and so the only radioactive decay pathway that it has been observed to undergo is the extremely rare process of double beta decay. Its half-life is about 6.4×1019 years, so for all practical purposes it can be treated as stable. One factor contributing to this unusual stability is that 20 and 28 are both magic numbers, making 48Ca a "doubly magic" nucleus.

Since 48Ca is both practically stable and neutron-rich, it is a valuable starting material for the production of new nuclei in particle accelerators, both by fragmentation and by fusion reactions with other nuclei, for example in the discoveries of the heaviest five elements on the periodic table, from flerovium to oganesson. Heavier nuclei generally require a greater fraction of neutrons for maximum stability, so neutron-rich starting materials are necessary.

48Ca is the lightest nucleus known to undergo double beta decay and the only one simple enough to be analyzed with the sd nuclear shell model. It also releases more energy (4.27 MeV) than any other double beta decay candidate. These properties make it an interesting probe of nuclear structure models and a promising candidate in the ongoing search for neutrinoless double beta decay.

See also
 Nickel-48

References 

Isotopes of calcium